ONG & ONG is a Singaporean industrial design, architecture, and urban planning firm. It was first established in 1972 by Ong Teng Cheong and his wife Ling Siew May.

Aside from Singapore, the company also has international offices in various countries around Asia, including China, Japan, Vietnam, Malaysia, Indonesia, Mongolia, and Thailand.

History
The company was founded in 1972 as Ong & Ong Architects & Town Planners. It was incorporated in 2007 as ONG & ONG Private Limited.

In 2001, Ong's youngest son Ong Tze Boon took over the running of the company as the Group Executive Chairman. During this time, the company grew from 60 employees to nearly 1,000 across eight countries.

Ashvinkumar Kantilal is the current Group Chief Executive Officer, joining the company in 2010.

Awards
Good Design Award (Chicago Athenaeum) 2019
SG Mark Award 2019 for Bedok Public Library and BeyondPak
WIN Awards 2019 for American International Hospital & Bedok Public Library
Asia Pacific Property Awards 2019 for Architecture in different countries (5 Star Award winner)
HDB Design Awards 2019 for Jurong Central Plaza under Rejuvenation category
International Property Awards 2018 for Monterey Residences
Asia Pacific Property Awards 2018 for Architecture in different countries (5 Star Award winner)
A’ Design Awards (Gold Winner) 2018 for Faber-House and KAP-House
International Architecture Awards 2018 for Gateway Theatre and KAP-House
Architecture Masterprize 2018 Winners for Heartbeat@Bedok, Al-Ansar Mosque and Bishopsgate House
ArchDaily Building of the Year 2009 for 55 Blair Road
Architecture Heritage Awards 1997 for CHIJMES

References

Multinational companies headquartered in Singapore
Architecture firms of Singapore
Singaporean designers
Industrial design firms
Design companies established in 1972
Singaporean companies established in 1972